Mazkeret Batya (lit. Mazkeret Batya spans an area of 7,440 dunams (7 km²). The mayor of Mazkeret Batya is Gaby Gaon.

History
Mazkeret Batya was established on November 7, 1883 by 11 ultra-orthodox farmers from Russia, one of which was Yaakov Laskovsky, and 7 local Jews. It was originally called Ekron, the first agricultural settlement of the Hovevei Zion movement. The land was purchased by Baron Rothschild in an early attempt to introduce Jewish farming in Palestine. Rabbi Shmuel Mohilever was instrumental in mobilizing funding and organizing the settlers. Mohilever's remains were later reinterred in the Mazkeret Batya cemetery. In 1887 the name was changed to Mazkeret Batya, in memory of Betty Solomon de Rothschild, mother of Baron Edmond James de Rothschild. The history of the founding is described in the book "Rebels in the Holy Land", by the historian Sam Finkle.

The economy of the village was originally based on dry farming, which continued even after the Mekorot Company constructed a pipeline to bring water from Rehovot. In 1947, Mazkeret Batya was home to 475 people.

According to a census conducted in 1922 by the British Mandate authorities, Mazkeret Batya (then Ekron) had a population 368 Jews. 
During the Mandate era, a Jewish police station was established in Mazkeret Batya to safeguard the local roads. In the War of Independence, convoys to besieged Jerusalem left from Mazkeret Batya. A field hospital operated there to care for Haganah fighters wounded at Latrun.

According to one source, at the end of the British Mandate for Palestine, the British tried to hand the nearby Aqir airfield and camp to the Palestinian Arabs, apparently without success.

Due to its proximity to Tel Aviv, Mazkeret Batya has recently experienced a growth spurt. Mazkeret Batya is a mixed community of religious and secular Jews. Historic landmarks include Beit Ha'Itut (Signal House), the Great Synagogue, Beit Meshek HaBaron ("The Baron's Farmhouse", now housing a cultural center), the saqiya-type water-rising system with its wooden wheels, well and pool, and an old farmyard.

Twin towns — sister cities

Mazkeret Batya is twinned with:
 Celle, Germany
 Calgary, Alberta, Canada
 Meudon, France
 Memphis, United States

References

External links
The "Gesher" community of Mazkeret Batya 
Kehila Datit of Mazkeret Batya

Populated places established in 1883
Jewish villages in the Ottoman Empire
Jewish villages in Mandatory Palestine
Local councils in Central District (Israel)
1883 establishments in the Ottoman Empire